Orah is a village in the municipality of Bileća, Republika Srpska, Bosnia and Herzegovina. It is inhabited by Serbs. The Dobrićevo Monastery was relocated from nearby to this location in 1964.

References

Villages in Republika Srpska
Populated places in Bileća